John Henry Rostill (16 June 1942 – 26 November 1973) was an English musician, bassist and composer, recruited by the Shadows to replace Brian Locking. He wrote many of the songs by the Shadows including "The Rise and Fall of Flingel Bunt" in 1964. He wrote or co-wrote three songs which were massive hits in the United States—"Let Me Be There", "If You Love Me, Let Me Know" and "Please Mr. Please"—but died before seeing them succeed.

Biography
Born in Kings Norton, Birmingham, England, Rostill attended Rutlish School in south London (1953–59). He worked with several artists before joining the Shadows, including Bournemouth band the Interns (nowadays sometimes confused with Welsh band the Interns, who were based in London at this time signed with Tito Burns Agency; in fact, they were two different bands), the Flintstones and a stint as part of Zoot Money's early backing band. He also played in the bands recruited to back such visiting artists as the Everly Brothers and Tommy Roe.

Stylistically, Rostill combined the solidity of Brian Locking and the adventurousness of Jet Harris. Many of his bass lines were heavily syncopated and he developed a range of new sounds on the Burns bass during his time with the group, a longer period than Harris and Locking put together. To many players, Rostill was ahead of his time and included double-stopping in his technique. Unusually for that time, Rostill sometimes played bass finger-style as well as with a plectrum, depending on the sound he wanted.

After the Shadows' break-up at the end of the 1960s, Rostill toured with Tom Jones.

Rostill was a prolific songwriter, contributing to the Shadows' output from the start (both as a solo composer and as part of the mid-sixties "Marvin/Welch/Bennett/Rostill" team). This combination composed the hits "The Rise and Fall of Flingel Bunt" (a UK no. 5, 1964) and “Genie with the Light Brown Lamp" (UK no. 17, 1965)  as well as all the tunes on the 1964 Rhythm & Greens EP.

They also wrote the Cliff Richard and the Shadows hits, "I Could Easily Fall (In Love with You)" (UK no. 6, 1964), "Time Drags By" (UK no. 10, 1966) and "In the Country" (UK no. 6, 1967).

He later went on to write for other artists such as Elvis Presley and Olivia Newton-John ("Let Me Be There" (US no. 6, 1973), "If You Love Me, Let Me Know" (US no. 5, 1974) and "Please Mr. Please" (US no. 3, 1975), the last co-written with Bruce Welch).

As a Shadow, Rostill played a prototype Burns "Shadows" bass guitar which differed from the production model that followed. A replica of his bass was produced by Burns London in late 2006. His personal favourite instrument was a Fender Jazz bass, which he played in both the Terry Young Band and in Bournemouth band, the Interns. He also used it with the Shadows towards the end when the Burns instrument began to wear out.

John Rostill died in Radlett, Hertfordshire, England, on 26 November 1973 aged 31. He was found dead from barbiturate poisoning in his recording studio by his wife and Bruce Welch.  The coroner recorded a verdict of "suicide while in a depressed state of mind".

He left behind his wife Margaret and his son Paul, who was a year old when his father died.

Early career
1963 – Zoot Money Quartet
Zoot Money (keyboards); Andy Summers (guitar); Jimmy Shipstone (guitar); John Rostill (bass); Colin Allen (drums)

1964 – The Interns

Discography
1969:  Tom Jones Live in Las Vegas
1971: "Green Apples"/"Funny Old World" – Columbia – DB 8794.

Filmography
Wonderful Life (US title: Swingers' Paradise)
Finders Keepers
Rhythm 'n Greens (B-film)
Thunderbirds are Go (as puppets)

Pantomimes
Aladdin (appeared with Cliff Richard)
Cinderella (appeared with Cliff Richard)

Bibliography
Funny Old World by Rob Bradford.

References

English rock bass guitarists
English pop guitarists
English male guitarists
Male bass guitarists
People from Birmingham, West Midlands
Barbiturates-related deaths
1942 births
1973 deaths
20th-century English musicians
The Shadows members
People from Radlett
20th-century English bass guitarists
20th-century British male musicians
Drug-related suicides in England